Nichols is an unincorporated community in Contra Costa County, California, United States. The place is named for William H. Nichols, president of the General Chemical Company of New York, which built in 1909 a plant here to produce fertilizer and a number of other chemicals for industrial use. In 1921, General Chemical became a division of Nichols's Allied Chemical, later Allied Corporation.

References

Unincorporated communities in California
Unincorporated communities in Contra Costa County, California